Maxera is a genus of moths of the family Erebidae described by Francis Walker in 1865.

Species
Some species of this genus are:
 Maxera arizanensis Wileman 1914
 Maxera atripunctata (Hampson, 1910)
 Maxera bathyscia D. S. Fletcher, 1961
 Maxera brachypecten Hampson, 1926
 Maxera brunneoasperus Griveaud & Viette, 1962
 Maxera digoniata (Hampson, 1902)
 Maxera discosticta Hampson 1897
 Maxera euryptera Hampson, 1926
 Maxera kanshireiensis
 Maxera inclusa (Strand, 1912)
 Maxera laportei (Viette, 1979)
 Maxera lophocera (Hampson, 1910)
 Maxera marchalii (Boisduval, 1833)
 Maxera nigriceps (Walker, 1858)
 Maxera nova (Viette, 1956)
 Maxera oblita Moore 1882
 Maxera pallidula (Butler, 1875)
 Maxera subocellata Walker, 1865
 Maxera zygia (Wallengren, 1863)

References

Walker, 1865. List of the Specimens of Lepidopterous Insects in the Collection of the British Museum (33): 809

Calpinae